Dinosterol is a type of steroid produced by several genera of dinoflagellates.  It is a 4α-methyl sterol (4α,23,24-trimethyl-5α-cholest-22E-en-3β-ol), a derivative of dinosterane, rarely found in other classes of protists.

This sterol and others have been considered as class-specific, being biomarkers for dinoflagellates, although dinosterol is produced in minor amounts by a small number of other phytoplankton, such as the marine diatom Navicula speciosa. and Prymnesiophytes of the genus Pavlova.

Dinosterols show similar abundances as dinocysts. Other studies found a nonlinear  or did not find a direct link between dinocyst abundances and sterol concentrations.

Dinosterol has been used as indicator for dinoflagellate production in the Cariaco Basin.

Hydrogen isotope ratios in dinosterols can serve to reconstruct salinity semi-quantitatively.

Some studies have shown that certain dinoflagellates produce sterols that have the potential to serve as genera-specific biomarkers.  Recent work showed that dinoflagellate genera, which formed discrete clusters in the 18S rDNA-based phylogeny, shared similar sterol compositions. This suggested that the sterol compositions of dinoflagellates are explained by the evolutionary history of this lineage.

References 

Sterols